Liostomia eburnea is a species of sea snail, a marine gastropod mollusk in the family Pyramidellidae, the pyrams and their allies.

Description
The white, shining shell has a smooth sculpture. Its length measures 4–5 mm. The four whorls of the teleoconch are rather convex, subangulated at the suture. The aperture is ovate-elliptic. The peristome is thin, simple, acute, effuse anteriorly. The umbilicus is narrow.

Distribution
This species occurs in the following locations:
 European waters (ERMS scope) (Barents Sea; Okhotsk Sea)
 Gulf of St Lawrence, Canada to Massachusetts, USA
 Gulf of Maine
 Northwest Atlantic Ocean

Notes
Additional information regarding this species:
 Distribution: Range: 74°N to 42°N; 70.5°W to 0°W. Distribution: Greenland; Greenland: West Greenland, East Greenland; Canada; Canada: Gulf of St. Lawrence, New Brunswick; USA: Maine, Massachusetts
 Habitat: circalittoral of the Gulf and estuary

References

External links
 To Biodiversity Heritage Library (15 publications)
 To CLEMAM
 To Encyclopedia of Life
 To USNM Invertebrate Zoology Mollusca Collection
 To ITIS
 To World Register of Marine Species

Pyramidellidae
Gastropods described in 1851